Uparaja or Ouparath, also Ouparaja (Oupahat), was a royal title reserved for the viceroy in the Buddhist dynasties in Burma, Cambodia, and Laos and Thailand, as well as some of their minor tributary kingdoms.

Burma
The Great Deputy King, in full Maha Uparaja Anaukrapa Ainshe Min, incorrectly interpreted as Crown Prince by Europeans, and addressed as His Royal Highness, was the single highest rank among the Min-nyi Min-tha, i.e. princes of the royal blood. It is shortened to Ainshe Min.

However, the position was not reserved for the highest birth rank (if there is one, Shwe Kodaw-gyi Awratha, i.e. eldest son of the sovereign, by his chief Queen), nor did it carry a plausible promise of succession, which was usually only settled in an ultimate power struggle.

Cambodia
The word Ouparach is derived from both Sanskrit and Pali languages, literally means Vice King, who obtains the position following the crowned king. The full term of Ouparach in order to provide the proper honor is Samdach Preah Ouparach or Samdach Preah Moha Ouparach. According to tradition of Kingdom of Cambodia, Samdach Preah Moha Ouparach positions as the supreme official controlling other high and low officials.

Siam (Thailand) 

Uparat, in full Phra Maha Upparat, as pronounced in historical Siam, translates to viceroy. Front Palace, however, was the more usual designation, often referred to in English as Second King or Vice King.

The office was discontinued in 1876 by Rama V, following the Front Palace Crisis of 1874, in favour of the office of Crown Prince of Siam. Note that those serving vice a king constitute a different office, that of regent or regency council.

See also
 Burmese royal titles
 Thai royal ranks and titles
 Front Palace
 Chakri Dynasty

References

Gubernatorial titles
Royal titles
Noble titles
Thai monarchy
Burmese royal titles